Archibald-Vroom House is located in Ridgewood, Bergen County, New Jersey, United States. The house was built in 1785 and was added to the National Register of Historic Places on July 24, 1984. Dr. William Vroom, a renowned physician, converted the house into a small hospital in 1888. The house is now used as a retail site.

See also
National Register of Historic Places listings in Bergen County, New Jersey

References

Houses on the National Register of Historic Places in New Jersey
Houses completed in 1785
Houses in Bergen County, New Jersey
Ridgewood, New Jersey
National Register of Historic Places in Bergen County, New Jersey
New Jersey Register of Historic Places